Jean-Claude Ndarusanze is a Burundian professional footballer who plays as a forward for LLB Académic FC in the Burundi Football League. He was topscorer in the 2017–18 Rwanda Premier League with 15 goals, when played for APR F.C.

International career
He was invited by Lofty Naseem, the national team coach, to represent Burundi in the 2014 African Nations Championship held in South Africa.

International goals
Scores and results list Burundi's goal tally first.

References

Living people
2014 African Nations Championship players
Burundi A' international footballers
Burundian footballers
1988 births
Association football forwards
Burundi international footballers